Dinitrogen difluoride is a chemical compound with the formula N2F2. It is a gas at room temperature, and was first identified in 1952 as the thermal decomposition product of the azide N3F. It has the structure F−N=N−F and exists in both a cis- and trans-form.

Isomers 
The cis configuration lies in a C2v symmetry and the trans-form has a symmetry of C2h. These isomers are thermally interconvertible but can be separated by low temperature fractionation. The trans-form is less thermodynamically stable but can be stored in glass vessels. The cis-form attacks glass over a time scale of about 2 weeks to form silicon tetrafluoride and nitrous oxide:

2 N2F2 + SiO2 → SiF4 + 2 N2O

Preparation 
Most preparations of dinitrogen difluoride give mixtures of the two isomers, but they can be prepared independently.

An aqueous method involves N,N-difluorourea with concentrated potassium hydroxide.  This gives a 40% yield with three times more of the trans isomer.

Difluoramine forms a solid unstable compound with potassium fluoride (or rubidium fluoride or caesium fluoride) which decomposes to dinitrogen difluoride.

It can also be prepared by photolysis of tetrafluorohydrazine and bromine:

N2F4 ->[hv][Br_2] N2F2 + byproducts

Reactions 
The cis form of dinitrogen difluoride will react with strong fluoride ion acceptors such as  antimony pentafluoride to form the N2F+ cation.

 N2F2 + SbF5 → N2F+[SbF6]−

In the solid phase, the observed N=N and N−F bond distances in the N2F+ cation are 1.089(9) and 1.257(8) Å respectively, among the shortest experimentally observed N−N and N−F bonds.

References 

Inorganic nitrogen compounds
Nitrogen fluorides
Nonmetal halides